Crosspoint is a Canadian youth current affairs television series which aired on CBC Television in 1977.

Premise
This series featured youth who explained and demonstrated their various interests. Segments were recorded in many Canadian cities.

Scheduling
This half-hour series was broadcast on Sundays at 4:00 p.m. (Eastern) from 2 January to 26 June 1977.

References

External links
 

1977 Canadian television series debuts
1977 Canadian television series endings
CBC Television original programming